Carlos Ventosa Delmas (born March 4, 1971) is a former backstroke swimmer from Spain, who competed at the 1992 Summer Olympics for his native country. He is best known for winning the silver medal in the Men's  Medley Relay at the 1993 FINA Short Course World Championships, alongside Sergio López Miró, Joaquín Fernández and José Maria Rojano.

References
 
 

1971 births
Living people
Spanish male backstroke swimmers
Olympic swimmers of Spain
Swimmers at the 1992 Summer Olympics
Medalists at the FINA World Swimming Championships (25 m)
Mediterranean Games silver medalists for Spain
Mediterranean Games bronze medalists for Spain
Mediterranean Games medalists in swimming
Swimmers at the 1991 Mediterranean Games